Benstonea is a genus of flowering plants in the family Pandanaceae. It was formerly classified as Pandanus subgenus Acrostigma, but in 2012 was recognized as a distinct genus based on morphology and DNA sequencing. Benstonea is distributed from India to Fiji with centres of diversity in Borneo, Peninsular Malaysia and New Guinea.

 Species

Gallery

References 

 

 
Pandanales genera